The 1985 1000 km Spa was the seventh round of the 1985 World Endurance Championship.  It took place at the Circuit de Spa-Francorchamps, Belgium on September 1, 1985.  In the first half of the race the two leading drivers collided, which resulted in the death of defending Drivers Champion Stefan Bellof.  The race organisers ended the race early, thus allowing the Martini Racing Lancia of drivers Mauro Baldi, Bob Wollek, and Riccardo Patrese to win their only victory of the year.  It was also the last victory scored by the Lancia LC2.

Bellof accident
The 1000 km of Spa was held only three weeks after Manfred Winkelhock was killed in an accident at the series' previous round, the 1000 km of Mosport.  Halfway through the race, defending Drivers Champion Stefan Bellof in the Brun Motorsport Porsche 956 was battling for the race lead with 1982 and 1983 Drivers Champion Jacky Ickx in the Rothmans Porsche 962C.  Ickx led Bellof out of the La Source hairpin and down the front stretch into the Eau Rouge corner, starting the 78th lap of the race.  Both drivers had only just been handed their cars from their teammates during a pit stop five laps earlier.

Entering the left kink at the bottom of the hill, Bellof moved to the left of Ickx in an attempt to set up a pass for the immediate right-hander up the hill.  Bellof's right front came into contact with Ickx's left rear, and both drivers spun up to the left up the hill, impacting the barriers.  Ickx's car hit the wall on the right rear side, while Bellof went straight into the barriers, breaking through and hitting a secondary wall.   Bellof's Porsche caught fire moments after the wreck.  Ickx, able to climb from his car, attempted to aid safety workers in helping Bellof.  During the caution period, members of the Brun team also arrived to aid in the rescue.

Although the fire was extinguished and the driver extracted from the wreckage within forty minutes, Stefan Bellof was pronounced dead only ten minutes later after he had reached the track hospital, although it was believed that he had actually died on impact.  Out of respect for Bellof, the race organisers chose to end the event earlier than planned.  The entire incident was recorded on an in-car camera that Ickx's 962C was carrying.  Even after the accident, the camera continued to work, and was pointed in the direction of Bellof's wreckage.

Official results
Class winners in bold.  Cars failing to complete 90% of the winner's distance marked as Not Classified (NC).

Statistics
 Pole Position - #4 Martini Racing - 2:05.91
 Fastest Lap - #1 Rothmans Porsche - 2:10.73
 Average Speed - 169.335 km/h

References

 
 

Spa
1000km
6 Hours of Spa-Francorchamps